Paul (Paúl) Klein (born 23. November 1915, died 20. March 1992) was a German–Ecuadorian chess master and arbiter.

Born in Germany, he emigrated to South America because of Nazi policy. Klein played for Ecuador in the 14th Chess Olympiad at Leipzig 1960.

Awarded the International Arbiter title, he was a Head Referee in the 23rd Chess Olympiad, and in the 8th Women's Chess Olympiad, both at Buenos Aires 1978. He was also the head referee at the World Chess Championship rematch between Anatoly Karpov and Viktor Korchnoi at Merano 1981.

References

External links
Paul Klein at 365Chess.com

1915 births
1992 deaths
German chess players
Ecuadorian chess players
German emigrants to Ecuador
Jewish chess players
Chess arbiters
Jewish emigrants from Nazi Germany
20th-century chess players